Confidence Game is a 2016 American thriller film written and directed by Deborah Twiss.  The film stars Sean Young, Deborah Twiss, James McCaffrey, and Steve Stanulis with Stefano Da Fre and Robert Clohessy in supporting roles.

Sylvie (Young) runs a crime ring on Long Island and violently manipulates her minions to exact a deep revenge on the notoriously unethical film producer David (McCaffrey).

Cast

 Sean Young as Sylvie
 Deborah Twiss as Jessica
 James McCaffrey as David
 Steve Stanulis as Michael
 Stefano Da Fre as Jingo
 Robert Clohessy as Anthony
 Brandon Tyler Jones as Carlos
 Shing Ka as Corey
 Bill Sorvino as Mack
 Joe Pallister as Vinnie
 Lawrence Whitener as Actor
 Gaetano Sciortino as Jean Luc
 Sydney McCann as Lola
 José André Sibaja as Waiter
 Jane Casserly as Ginger Porter
 Bruce Hermann as Connor
 Matthew McCann as Tommy
 Drew Henriksen as Joey
 Viktoria Tocca	 as herself
 Chase Hayden	 as Son
 Marc Lebowitz as Amir Kreshing
 Sophia Lebowitz as Receptionist

Production
Principal photography took place in December 2014 and January 2015 in New York City, The Hamptons and Staten Island. Some scenes were shot in The Cutting Room in New York City.

Release
Confidence Game was released on September 1, 2016.

References

External links
 

2016 crime thriller films
2016 films
American crime thriller films
Films shot in New York (state)
American independent films
2016 independent films
2010s English-language films
2010s American films